Punggi Jin clan is one of the Korean clans. Their Bon-gwan is in Yeongju, North Gyeongsang Province. According to the research held in 2000, the number of Punggi Jin clan’s member was 11046. Their founder was  who worked as the deputy minister of defense (兵部侍郎, Bingbu Shilang) in Tang dynasty during Emperor Gaozong of Tang’s reign.  collapsed Baekje in 660 with Su Dingfang who was a four-star rank as the Silla-Tang alliance‘s general. After that,  was naturalized in Silla.

See also 
 Korean clan names of foreign origin

References

External links 
 

 
Korean clan names of Chinese origin
Jin clans